Young Poong Group is a South Korean chaebol (conglomerate) specializing in the mining, electronics, and book-selling industries. It was established in 1949 and is currently ranked among the 30 largest conglomerates in South Korea.

Subsidiaries
Young Poong Books
Korea Zinc
Signetics

See also
Chaebol
List of South Korean companies

References

External links

Chaebol
Conglomerate companies established in 1949
Conglomerate companies of South Korea
South Korean companies established in 1949